Andrei Cosmin Ciolacu (born 9 August 1992) is a Romanian footballer who plays as a striker for Maltese club Birkirkara. In his career, Ciolacu played also for teams such as: Rapid București, Târgu Mureș or FC Tskhinvali, among others.

Career
In January 2016, Ciolacu signed a contract with ASA Târgu Mureș.

Midway through 2017, Ciolacu signed for Singaporean club Warriors, integrating quickly into the team.

On his Singapore League Cup debut against Home United, Ciolacu scored three goals, taking his club to the top of the group. In December 2017, he said that "The speed of play in Singapore is lower than in Romania, and the players do not give much importance to physical training, although this matters a lot in modern football. There is room for improvement, of course, but there is fantastic potential for development."

On 24 January 2020, Ciolacu joined Italian Serie D club Avezzano. He played for the club until the summer 2020, where he moved back to Romania to join FC U Craiova 1948.

Honours
FC U Craiova 1948
 Liga II: 2020–21

Floriana
 FA Trophy: 2021–22
 Maltese Super Cup runner-up: 2022

References

External links
 
 

1992 births
Living people
Footballers from Bucharest
Romanian footballers
Association football forwards
Liga I players
Liga II players
Ekstraklasa players
Erovnuli Liga players
Singapore Premier League players
Serie D players
Maltese Premier League players
FC Rapid București players
CS Otopeni players
ASA 2013 Târgu Mureș players
ASC Daco-Getica București players
FC Metaloglobus București players
FC U Craiova 1948 players
FC Spartaki Tskhinvali players
Śląsk Wrocław players
Warriors FC players
Avezzano Calcio players
Floriana F.C. players
Birkirkara F.C. players
Romania under-21 international footballers
Romanian expatriate footballers
Romanian expatriate sportspeople in Poland
Romanian expatriate sportspeople in Singapore
Romanian expatriate sportspeople in Italy
Expatriate footballers in Poland
Expatriate footballers in Singapore
Expatriate footballers in Italy
Expatriate footballers in Malta